Lynn Buckle is an Irish writer.  She is deaf, and her second novel, What Willow Says, won the Barbellion Prize for writers living with chronic illness or disability. She is the founder of the Irish Climate Writing Group.

In February 2022 she was interviewed on BBC Radio 4's Front Row.

Early life
Buckle was born in Bristol, England, and studied at the University of Warwick, Camberwell School of Art and NUI Maynooth. She moved to Ireland in around 1990 and

Career
Buckle's first published novel was The Groundsmen in 2018.  After writing it she offered it to several publishers before it was accepted by époque press, which she describes as "a fairly new UK indie company based in Cheltenham".

Her second novel, What Willow Says, also published by époque, won the 2022 Barbellion Prize for writers who live with chronic illness or a disability. It has been described as "a meditation on nature and deafness."

She lost her hearing gradually and now hears "my versions of sounds, delivered through my technology".

In 2021 she was one of five writers to be virtual writers-in-residence in Norwich, England, during the COVID-19 pandemic, under the banner "Imagining the City". During the project she wrote a short story "Ailbhe’s Tale" which "draws inspiration from Norwich and Dublin's shared shared histories of hidden waterways through the lens of gender, power, and place." and was later published as part of Arachne Press's anthology What Meets the Eye? The Deaf Perspective.

Buckle is increasingly addressing the topic of climate and is the founder of the Irish Writers Climate Group at the Irish Writer's Centre.

Selected publications

References

External links

Lynn Buckle page on époque press website including video clips of Buckle reading from her two novels
  

Year of birth missing (living people)
Living people
Deaf writers
Irish deaf people
21st-century Irish women writers
Alumni of the University of Warwick
Alumni of Camberwell College of Arts
Alumni of Maynooth University
People from Bristol